Jalan Kuching-Bau, Federal Route 1-8 and 1-9 is a federal road in Kuching Division, Sarawak, Malaysia.

List of Interchanges 

Malaysian Federal Roads